Sergey Vyacheslavovich Palagin (Russian: Серге́й Вячесла́вович Пала́гин; 26 March 1968 — 6 November 2020) was a Russian military pilot, lieutenant colonel and combatant during the Ossetian-Ingush conflict, First Chechen War, Second Chechen War, War of Dagestan, and Ossetian war. He was awarded the title Hero of the Russian Federation in 2004.

Biography 
Over his time in service of the Russian Military (1985–2014), Palagin earned the nickname "Brother" (Russian: Братишка), given to him by soldiers who were often rescued by his experienced helicopter crew in critical situations. He flew an  Mi-8 model helicopter. 

Palagin died from complications of COVID-19 on 6 November 2020, during the COVID-19 pandemic in Russia. He was 52 years old.

Awards 
 Hero of the Russian Federation (by order of the President of Russia of 6 April 2004, Gold Star medal No. 818).
 Order "For Merit to the Fatherland" (4th class with Swords).
 Three Orders of Courage (1996, 2000 and 2002).
 Order of Military Merit.
 Multiple medals, including:
 Medal "For Courage" (ru) (2006);
 Medal "For Battle Merit";
 Medal of Nesterov;
 Medal "For Military Valor" (ru) (First (2002) and Second (2001) class);
 Medal "For Strengthening the Military Commonwealth" (ru);
 Medal "For Distinction in Military Service" (ru) (1st, 2nd and 3rd class);
 Medal "For Service in the Air Force" (ru);
 Medal "100 years of the Air Force".
 Badge "For Service in the Caucasus" from the Border Service of the Federal Security Service of the Russian Federation.
 Order of St. Sergius of Radonezh (ru) (3rd class).
 Order of Saint Anna (3rd class (2018)).
 Medal "For Services to the Stavropol Territory".
 The title: "Honorary Citizen of the city of Krasnodar" (ru) (2016).

References 

1968 births
2020 deaths
Russian military personnel
Heroes of the Russian Federation
Deaths from the COVID-19 pandemic in Russia